Oswald Bertram Lower (1863 in Adelaide, South Australia – 18 March 1925 in Wayville, South Australia) was an Australian chemist and pharmacist who is best known for his contributions to entomology, in particular butterflies and moths. His collection is now at the South Australian Museum.

References

External links
Image of Lower in Biology of Australian Butterflies page 15.

Australian entomologists
1863 births
1925 deaths
Scientists from Adelaide
Australian chemists
Entomologist stubs